The Inishowen Independent is a local print and digital newspaper for Inishowen, County Donegal, Ireland.

Launched in March 2007, the newspaper is printed every Tuesday. It publishes news, features, sports reports and event coverage for the Inishowen peninsula.

The 48-page newspaper is owned locally and produced by journalists living in Inishowen. It's public office is at 66 Millbrae, Buncrana, the largest town in Inishowen.

The newspaper has campaigned on local issues such as the mica crisis facing householders on the peninsula, politics, and environmental issues. It also publishes features on local entertainment, tourism and farming.

References 

2007 establishments in Ireland
Buncrana
Mass media in County Donegal
Newspapers published in the Republic of Ireland
Publications established in 2007
Weekly newspapers published in Ireland